Dmitri Dugin (born August 29, 1968 in Moscow) is a Russian water polo player who played on the silver medal squad at the 2000 Summer Olympics.

See also
 Russia men's Olympic water polo team records and statistics
 List of Olympic medalists in water polo (men)
 List of men's Olympic water polo tournament goalkeepers
 List of World Aquatics Championships medalists in water polo

External links
 

1968 births
Living people
Sportspeople from Moscow
Russian male water polo players
Water polo goalkeepers
Water polo players at the 1996 Summer Olympics
Water polo players at the 2000 Summer Olympics
Olympic water polo players of Russia
Olympic silver medalists for Russia
Olympic medalists in water polo
Medalists at the 2000 Summer Olympics